Raj Gupta may refer to:

Rajat Gupta, former Managing Director of McKinsey & Company implicated in an insider trading scandale
Rajiv L. Gupta, chairman of Delphi Automotive

See also 
Rajiv Gupta (disambiguation)

...